This list of engineering awards is an index to articles about notable awards for achievements in engineering. It includes aerospace engineering, chemical engineering, civil engineering, electrical engineering, electronic engineering, structural engineering and systems science awards. It excludes computer-related awards, computer science awards, industrial design awards, mechanical engineering awards, motor vehicle awards, occupational health and safety awards and space technology awards, which are covered by separate lists.

The list is organized by the region and country of the organizations that sponsor the awards, but some awards are not limited to people from that country.

International

Africa

Americas

Asia

Europe

Oceania

See also
 List of computer science awards
 List of computer-related awards
 List of mechanical engineering awards
 List of motor vehicle awards
 List of space technology awards
 Lists of awards
 Lists of science and technology awards

References

 
Awards
Engineering